Samuel Jones-Loyd, 1st Baron Overstone (25 September 1796 – 17 November 1883) was a British banker and politician.

Background and education
Loyd was the only son of the Rev. Lewis Loyd and Sarah, daughter of John Jones, a Manchester banker. He was educated at Eton and Trinity College, Cambridge.

Banking
Loyd's father had given up the ministry to take a partnership in his father-in-law's bank and became the founder of the London branch of Jones, Loyd & Co. Loyd joined his father's bank, and took control of the bank after his father retired in 1844. On his father's death in 1858 Loyd inherited an estate worth £ 2 million. In 1864 the bank became incorporated with the London and Westminster Bank.

Political career
Loyd sat in parliament as Whig member for Hythe from 1819 to 1826, and unsuccessfully contested Manchester in 1832. As early as 1832 he was recognized as one of the foremost authorities on banking, and he enjoyed much influence with successive ministries and chancellors of the exchequer. Loyd is considered one of the great figures in British monetary history, particularly with respect to the Bank Charter Act of 1844. He was also opposed to limited liability and the introduction of a decimal currency. In 1850 he was raised to the peerage as Baron Overstone, of Overstone and of Fotheringhay, both in the County of Northampton. Lord Overstone was a member of The Club (Literary Club) and the Political Economy Club and served as High Sheriff of Warwickshire in 1838 and as President of the Royal Statistical Society from 1851 to 1853. In 1847 and 1848, he served on the committee of the British Relief Association, which raised almost half a million pounds on behalf of the famine victims in Ireland. (see, Christine Kinealy, Charity and the Great Hunger. The Kindness of Strangers'.  Bloomsbury, 2013)

Family
Lord Overstone married Harriet, daughter of Ichabod Wright, in 1829. They had one son, who died as an infant, and a daughter. His seat was Overstone House, Overstone, Northamptonshire built in 1862–4 to a design by William Milford Teulon, brother of the more eminent - and notorious 'Rogue' - Victorian architect Samuel Sanders Teulon. Lady Overstone died on 6 November 1864. Overstone remained a widower until his death on 17 November 1883, aged 87. The barony died with him as he had no surviving male issue. His will was proven on 31 December at £2,118,803 17s. 5d. (roughly equivalent to £ in ). 

The majority of Overstone's fortune was passed on to his daughter, Harriet. She was the wife of Robert Lindsay, who assumed the additional surname of Loyd and was created Baron Wantage in 1885. Overstone's relative Lewis Vivian Loyd, the son of his second cousin William Jones Loyd, inherited part of the estate, including the manor of Withybrook, Wolvey, Warwickshire.

References

Further reading

External links 
 
The Overstone Papers in Senate House Library, University of London
 http://www.aim25.ac.uk/cats/14/2017.htm
 http://www.berkshirehistory.com/bios/rjllinsay.html
 http://freepages.genealogy.rootsweb.com/~villages/berks/ardington_lockinge.htm

1796 births
1883 deaths
People educated at Eton College
Alumni of Trinity College, Cambridge
Loyd
Barons in the Peerage of the United Kingdom
High Sheriffs of Warwickshire
Presidents of the Royal Statistical Society
Loyd
UK MPs 1818–1820
UK MPs 1820–1826
UK MPs who were granted peerages
Sheriffs of Warwickshire
Peers of the United Kingdom created by Queen Victoria